Kampong Speu Football Club (Khmer: ខេត្តកំពង់ស្ពឺ), is a football club based in Kampong Speu Province, Cambodia. The club competes in the Hun Sen Cup, the major national cup competition of Cambodian football. The team represents the Province and competes annually in the Provincial Stage of the competition.

References
https://cncc-football.com/hun-sen-cup.html

External links 
Hun Sen Cup
Football clubs in Cambodia